Helen Margaret Taylor Thompson , née Laurie Walker (7 August 1924 – 6 September 2020) was a British aid worker  who co-founded Europe's first AIDS hospice.

Life

Helen served in Special Operations Executive during World War Two, signing the official secrets act aged nineteen and receiving and sending coded messages to agents in the field.

In 1952, Helen became a member of the board of the Mildmay Mission Hospital. The hospital had been founded by Catherine Pennefather in 1877 in a converted warehouse in Old Nichol slums behind Shoreditch Church. It was meant to be closed in the 1980's, but Helen led the campaign to keep it open and, inspired by Jesus' love for the outcast, converted it into Europe's first AIDS hospital, in the face of strong opposition.

With Lord Andrew Mawson and Adele Blakebrough, in 1995 Helen organised a meal for 33,000 people of a range of backgrounds to enjoy together. Termed the 'Great Banquet', this prompted the formation of the Community Action Network in 1998, which continues to provide support for other charities.

In 2000, Helen founded the charity 'Education Saves Lives', designed to education children in the developing world about health issues.

Recognition and later life

In 2018, she was chosen as one of the BBC's 100 Women who have made an impact.

Helen died in September 2020, at the age of 96.

References

1924 births
2020 deaths
BBC 100 Women
British charity and campaign group workers
Officers of the Order of the British Empire